Alok Chaturvedi "Pajjan" is an Indian politician who was elected in 2018 to the Madhya Pradesh Legislative Assembly from Chhatarpur Constituency.

References

Year of birth missing (living people)
Living people
Madhya Pradesh MLAs 2018–2023
Place of birth missing (living people)
Indian National Congress politicians from Madhya Pradesh